Schloßkirche or Schlosskirche (German: "Castle Church") may refer to:
Schlosskirche (Königsberg)
All Saints' Church, Wittenberg

German words and phrases